Ángela Lorena Gutiérrez Sequeira (born 11 March 1990) is a Nicaraguan footballer who plays as a goalkeeper for the Nicaragua women's national team.

International career
Gutiérrez capped for Nicaragua at senior level during two CONCACAF Women's Olympic Qualifying Championship qualifications (2012 and 2020).

References 

1990 births
Living people
Nicaraguan women's footballers
Women's association football goalkeepers
Nicaragua women's international footballers